Environmental protection
Nature conservation